Puntius bramoides is a species of ray-finned fish in the genus Puntius. It has been reported from Indonesia and the Mekong in Laos, but its validity is questionable and recent authorities treat it as a synonym of Barbonymus balleroides.

References 

Puntius
Freshwater fish of Indonesia
Taxa named by Achille Valenciennes
Fish described in 1842